Peter A. Leventritt (October 5, 1915 – December 6, 1997) was an American bridge player, president of the American Contract Bridge League (ACBL) for 1945–1946. Leventritt was from New York City.

Leventritt was inducted into the ACBL Hall of Fame in 2002.

Bridge accomplishments

Honors

 ACBL Hall of Fame, 2002

Wins

 North American Bridge Championships (13)
 von Zedtwitz Life Master Pairs (2) 1944, 1951 
 Rockwell Mixed Pairs (1) 1950 
 Vanderbilt (2) 1953, 1964 
 Chicago Mixed Board-a-Match (3) 1949, 1950, 1959 
 Reisinger (3) 1941, 1949, 1963 
 Spingold (2) 1956, 1960

Runners-up

 North American Bridge Championships
 Master Individual (1) 1952 
 Rockwell Mixed Pairs (1) 1949 
 Hilliard Mixed Pairs (1) 1944 
 Open Pairs (1928-1962) (2) 1948, 1951 
 Vanderbilt (6) 1946, 1947, 1955, 1959, 1962, 1967 
 Mitchell Board-a-Match Teams (1) 1955 
 Chicago Mixed Board-a-Match (1) 1947 
 Reisinger (2) 1943, 1953

References

External links
 
 

1915 births
1997 deaths
American contract bridge players

Sportspeople from New York City
=